Francis William Caulfeild, 2nd Earl of Charlemont KP, PC (Ire) (3 January 1775 – 26 December 1863), styled Viscount Caulfeild until 1799, was an Irish peer and politician.

He was born the elder son of James Caulfeild, 1st Earl of Charlemont and his wife Mary Hickman, daughter of Thomas Hickman of County Clare.

In 1798 Caulfeild stood for Charlemont and Armagh County. He represented the latter constituency in the Irish House of Commons until 1799, when he became Earl of Charlemont on the death of his father. On 12 December 1806, he was elected as an Irish representative peer and assumed his seat in the House of Lords. He was appointed a Knight of the Order of St Patrick on 19 October 1831. In 1837 he was created Baron Charlemont in the Peerage of the United Kingdom, thereby giving him and his descendants an automatic seat in the House of Lords. He was Lord Lieutenant of Tyrone from 1839, and was a member of the Privy Council of Ireland.

He married Anne, the daughter and co-heiress of William Bermingham of Ross Hill, County Galway and Mary Rutledge. He died at his seat, Marino House in Clontarf, Dublin. His four children pre-deceased him and he was consequently succeeded in his estate and title by his nephew, James Molyneux Caulfeild.

References

External links

1775 births
1863 deaths
19th-century Irish people
Francis
Earls in the Peerage of Ireland
Caulfeild, Francis Caulfeild, Lord
Irish representative peers
Knights of St Patrick
Lord-Lieutenants of Tyrone
Caulfeild, Francis Caulfeild, Lord
Members of the Privy Council of Ireland
Peers of the United Kingdom created by William IV
Viscounts Charlemont